On 3 August 1979, Constitutional Convention election was held in Khorasan Province constituency with plurality-at-large voting format in order to decide seven seats for the Assembly for the Final Review of the Constitution

It resulted in a landslide victory for the Khomeinist candidates in the Coalition of Islamic Parties who swept all seats. They were followed by clerical rivals of Khomeini, including the leader of Hojjatieh, who were endorsed jointly by Hassan Tabatabaei Qomi and Mohammad al-Shirazi. The top four winning contenders were supported by both groupings, indicating that the former list had approximately twice number of supporters in comparison to the latter. The top candidate of the defeated Quintuple Coalition received no better than 5% of all votes cast, suppressing those supported by the Sunni community. Candidates of non-religious groups such as the left-wing Tudeh Party of Iran and the right-wing Nation Party of Iran could not receive more than a few thousand votes in their favor.

Result 

 
 
 
 
 
 
 
|-
|colspan="14" style="background:#E9E9E9;"|
|-
 
 
 
 
 
 
 
 
 
 
 
 
 
 
 
 
 
 
 
 

|-
|colspan=14|
|-
|colspan=14|Source:

References

1979 elections in Iran
History of Khorasan